HMAS Mallina was a  cargo ship built by Harland & Wolff, Belfast in 1909 as Mallina for the Australian United Steam Navigation Company for the Rockhampton to Sydney cargo route. She was requisitioned by the Royal Australian Navy in 1914, as a store carrier and collier. She was returned to her owners in 1915. She was sold in 1935 to Machida Shokai Kisen Kaisha, Japan and renamed Seiko Maru, before being sold to Kita Nippon Kisen Kaisha and renamed Siberia Maru No. 3, which was later shortened to Siberian Maru. While steaming in the Sulu Sea, Philippines on 24 September 1944, she was attacked by American aircraft of Task Force 38 and sunk with the loss of 158 of the 2,382 people on board.

Description
She was powered by a quadruple expansion steam engine, which had cylinders of 24½ inches (62 cm),  and  diameter by  stroke. The engine was built by Harland & Wolff, Belfast. In 1909, she had a complement of 37.

History
Mallina was built as yard number 407 in 1908–09 by Harland and Wolff, Belfast for the Australian United Steam Navigation Company at a cost of £70,000. She was launched from slip 6 on 25 March 1909. Mallina was completed on 29 April. Mallina was allocated the United Kingdom Official Number 115622.

Mallina departed from Belfast on 30 April for her maiden voyage, which was for delivery to her owners. On 20 June, Mallina ran aground off Haggerston Island, Queensland due to her pilot mistaking Clerke Island for Nob Island. She was refloated later that day. Following an enquiry into the grounding by the Queensland Marine Board, the pilot was cautioned. Entering service on 13 July 1909, she was employed on the Rockhampton–Sydney route. At the time, she was the longest vessel serving Rockhampton. Lady Norman was forced against  and Maida was forced against .

Mallina was requisitioned by the Royal Australian Navy in May 1914 for use as a store carrier and collier. She was commissioned in August as HMAS Mallina. She also supplied Royal Navy vessels patrolling off Central America. In February 1915, HMAS Mallina was decommissioned and returned to the Australian United Steam Navigation Company. On 11 May 1921, a sailor on Mallina fell through an open hatchway on the ship to his death. Her captain was fined A£15 for not having watchmen on duty guarding the open hatchway. On 13 December 1928, Mallina ran aground in the Brisbane River near the Victoria Bridge, Brisbane.

In July 1929, Mallina was sold to the Machida Shokai K.K. and was renamed Seiko Maru. The Japanese Official Number 34428 and Code Letters TSGF were allocated. Her port of registry was Kobe. In 1934, her Code Letters were changed to JDPC. On 31 October 1934, she was sold to Kita Nippon Kisen K.K. and was converted to a cargo liner. On 8 April 1935, she was renamed Siberia Maru No. 3. Her name had been shortened to Siberia Maru by 1937. On She served on the Tsuruga–Vladivostok route until 1939, then the Niigata–Seishin–Rashin route. On 30 January 1940. Siberia Maru was sold to the Nipponkai Kisen K.K. Her port of registry was changed to Tokyo.

In November 1941, Siberia Maru was requisitioned by the Imperial Japanese Army. She was later converted to a byōinsen (hospital ship). Official notification of her status as a hospital ship was given on 29 October 1942. She also served as a troopship. An example of this use is that she departed from Ujina for Chingwangtao on 18 December 1942, carrying troops of the 55th Independent Engineer Battalion. In 1944, she was reclassified as a transport ship.

Fate
On 20 September 1944, Siberia Maru departed from Manila for Negros, Philippines as a member of Convoy C-203. There were 2,382 people on board, comprising 86 crew, 26 guards and lookouts and 2,270 troops and air force personnel. The convoy sheltered in Loc Bay, off Masbate on 21 September to avoid an American task force. The next day, the convoy was joined by the Imperial Japanese Navy supply ship  and minesweeper . On 24 September, the convoy departed from Loc Bay for Negros. The convoy was north west of Pulanduta Point, Masbate when it was attacked by 23 aircraft of Task Force 38. Siberia Maru was bombed and set afire. She sank at 
 with the loss of 158 lives.

References

Sources
Wilson, Michael; Royal Australian Navy 21st Century Warships, Naval auxiliaries 1911 to 1999 including Defence Maritime Services, Profile No. 4 - Revised Edition, Topmill Pty Ltd, Marrickville. 

1909 ships
Ships built in Belfast
Cargo ships of the Royal Australian Navy
Ships sunk by US aircraft
Ships built by Harland and Wolff
World War I merchant ships of Australia
Merchant ships of Australia
Merchant ships of Japan
World War II merchant ships of Japan
Maritime incidents in September 1944
Ships of the Imperial Japanese Army
Cargo liners
Hospital ships in World War II
Hospital ships of Japan
Maritime incidents in 1909
Maritime incidents in 1928